The men's qualification for the Olympic handball tournament will occur between January 2023 and March 2024, assigning quota places to the twelve squads for the Games: the hosts, the world champion, four continental events winners (Africa, Europe, Asia and Oceania, and the Americas), and six teams from the IHF World Olympic qualifying tournaments, respectively.

Summary

Legend

Host country

World Championships

World champion will directly qualify for Olympics. Since host nation France took the silver medal, the next six best placed teams (teams ranked 3-8) are eligible to play at the Olympic Qualification Tournaments. If any team subsequently qualifies directly for Olympics through their continental event, then the list will be shifted to the ninth place (or thereafter).

Continental qualification

Europe

European champion will directly qualify for Olympics. If they will be either Denmark or France, then highest ranked not already qualified team will obtain a berth at the games. The next two best placed teams, not already qualified for Olympics or the Olympic Qualification Tournaments (silver and bronze medalists or thereafter) are eligible to play at the Olympic Qualification Tournaments.

Americas

The winner of Pan American Games will directly qualify for Olympics. The Olympic Qualification Tournaments berth will be given to the Pan American Games runner-up.

Asia

Preliminary round

Group A

Group B

Knockout stage

Bracket

Final standing

Africa

Olympic Qualification Tournaments
The Olympic Qualification Tournaments will be held during the week of 11–17 March 2024. Only twelve eligble teams through the five events mentioned above could play in the tournament:

The top six teams from the World championship that did not already qualify through their continental championships are eligible to participate in the tournament.
The highest-ranked teams of each continent in the World championship represented the continent in order to determine the continental ranking. The first-ranked continent (Europe) received two more places for the tournament. The second (Africa), third (Asia), and fourth (Americas)-ranked continents received one place each. The last place belongs to a team from Oceania, if one was ranked between 8th–12th at the World Championship. As no team from Oceania met this condition, the second-ranked continent received an extra place instead. The teams that already earned their places through their World championship ranking will not be considered for receiving places through the continental criterion. In such cases, the access list will be rebalanced accordingly.
The twelve teams will be allocated in three pools of four teams according to the table below. The top two teams from each pool will qualify for the 2024 Olympic Games.

Teams
The following teams are eligible to participate in each of the Olympic Qualifying Tournaments. Teams in italics may still qualify directly for Olympics through their continental qualification event.

Key

Teams in italics may still qualify directly for Olympics through their continental qualification event or move to other tournaments.

See also
 Handball at the 2024 Summer Olympics – Women's qualification

References

Men's qualification
Handball Men
2023 in handball
2024 in handball
Olympics